Campodorus elegans is a species of parasitic wasps in the tribe Mesoleiini. It is found in England. The species was transferred from Mesoleius by Shaw and Kasparyan in 2003.

References

External links 

 

Ctenopelmatinae
Insects described in 1882
Fauna of England